Geldanamycin is a 1,4-benzoquinone ansamycin antitumor antibiotic that inhibits the function of Hsp90 (Heat Shock Protein 90) by binding to the unusual ADP/ATP-binding pocket of the protein. HSP90 client proteins play important roles in the regulation of the cell cycle, cell growth, cell survival, apoptosis, angiogenesis and oncogenesis.

Geldanamycin induces the degradation of proteins that are mutated or overexpressed in tumor cells such as v-Src, Bcr-Abl, p53, and ERBB2. This effect is mediated via HSP90. Despite its potent antitumor potential, geldanamycin presents several major drawbacks as a drug candidate such as hepatotoxicity, further, Jilani et al.. reported that geldanamycin induces the apoptosis of erythrocytes under physiological concentrations. These side effects have led to the development of geldanamycin analogues, in particular analogues containing a derivatisation at the 17 position:

 17-AAG
 17-DMAG

Biosynthesis 

Geldanamycin was originally discovered in the organism Streptomyces hygroscopicus. It is a macrocyclic polyketide that is synthesized by a Type I polyketide synthase. The genes gelA, gelB, and gelC encode for the polyketide synthase. The PKS is first loaded with 3-amino-5-hydroxybenzoic acid (AHBA). It then utilizes malonyl-CoA, methylmalonyl-CoA, and methoxymalonyl-CoA to synthesize the precursor molecule Progeldanamycin. This precursor is subjected to several enzymatic and non-enzymatic tailoring steps to produce the active molecule Geldanamycin, which include hydroxylation, o-methylation, carbamoylation, and oxidation.

Notes

References

External links 
A comprehensive  review about Geldanamycin, 17AAG and 17DMAG
Geldanamycin from  Fermentek
Geldanamycin from  Center for Pharmaceutical Research and Innovation
 Geldanamycin bound to proteins in the PDB

1,4-Benzoquinones
Carbamates
Lactams
Phenol ethers
Ethers
Secondary alcohols
Ansamycins